Wolfgang Amadeus Mozart's Piano Concerto No. 9 in E major, K. 271, known as the Jeunehomme or Jenamy concerto. It was written in Salzburg in 1777 when the composer was 21 years old.

Composition
Mozart completed the concerto in January 1777, nine months after his Piano Concerto No. 8 in C major and with few significant compositions in the intervening period. He composed the work for Victoire Jenamy, the daughter of Jean-Georges Noverre and a proficient pianist. Mozart performed the concerto at a private concert on 4 October 1777. Jenamy may have premiered the work earlier.

Structure
The work is scored for solo piano, 2 oboes, 2 horns (in E), and strings.

It consists of three movements:

I. Allegro
Unusually for the time, the first movement opens with interventions by the soloist, anticipating Beethoven's Fourth and Fifth Concertos. As Cuthbert Girdlestone (1964) notes, its departures from convention do not end with this early solo entrance but continue in the style of dialogue between piano and orchestra in the rest of the movement. Mozart wrote two cadenzas for this movement.

II. Andantino
The second movement is written in the relative minor key. In only five of Mozart's piano concertos is the second movement in a minor key (K. 41, K. 271, K. 456, K. 482, and K. 488. K. 41 is an arrangement). Mozart wrote two cadenzas for this movement.

III. Rondo (Presto)
The third movement, which opens with the solo piano, is in a rondo form on a large scale. It is interrupted by a slow minuet section in the subdominant key of A major (a procedure Mozart would repeat with his 22nd concerto, 1785, also in the key of E major). The work ends in the original tempo.

Reception
The work is highly regarded by critics. Charles Rosen has called it "perhaps the first unequivocal masterpiece [of the] classical style." Alfred Brendel has called it "one of the greatest wonders of the world". Alfred Einstein dubbed it "Mozart's Eroica". Cuthbert Girdlestone was not quite as effusive in his praise, however, noting that the slow movement, while a great leap forward for Mozart, was still somewhat limited and the work as a whole was not equal to the piano concertos from the composer's peak in Vienna from 1784 to 1787, nor equal to his best compositions overall.

Name
The work has long been known as the Jeunehomme Concerto. Théodore de Wyzéwa and Georges de Saint-Foix claimed that Mozart wrote the piece for an unnamed French pianist 'Jeunehomme' (French for "young man") visiting Salzburg. However, Michael Lorenz demonstrated in 2004 that the dedicatee was actually Victoire Jenamy (1749–1812), a daughter of Jean-Georges Noverre, a dancer who was one of Mozart's friends. Mozart had met Jenamy during his stay in Vienna in 1773.

Notes

Sources

External links
 
 
 , Murray Perahia (piano, conductor), English Chamber Orchestra (1976)
 "Alfred Brendel's Final Program Note" by Michael Lorenz
 "The Continuing 'Jeunehomme' Nonsense" by Michael Lorenz
 Collection of material on the Jenamy Concerto, michaelorenz.at

09
1777 compositions
Compositions in E-flat major
Music with dedications